The 2017 World Team Ninepin Bowling Classic Championships were the seventh edition of the team championships and held in Dettenheim, Germany, from 19 May to 27 May 2017.

In men's tournament Serbia secured gold medal, while in women's tournament world champion title was captured by host Germany.

Schedule

Two competitions were held.

All time are local (UTC+2).

Participating teams

Men

Women

Medal summary

Medal table

References 

 
World Team Ninepin Bowling Classic Championships
2017 in bowling
2017 in German sport
International sports competitions hosted by Germany
ninepin bowling classic